"Stevie" is a song by Australian alternative rock band, Spiderbait and was released in May 1999 as the second single from the band's fourth studio album Grand Slam (1999). "Stevie" peaked at number 81 on the Australian chart and ranked at number 84 on Triple J's Hottest 100 in 1999.

Track listing

Charts

Release history

References

 
1999 singles
1998 songs
Spiderbait songs
Universal Music Australia singles
Song recordings produced by Phil McKellar